The 2022 Nordic Artistic Gymnastics Championships was an artistic gymnastics competition held in Kópavogur, Iceland. The event was held between 2–3 July.  The competition featured both senior and junior fields.

Medalists

References 

Nordic
Nordic
Nordic